Filip Hlúpik (born 30 April 1991) is a professional Czech football player who plays for USC Mank.

Career
Hlúpik started his professional career at his hometown club 1. FC Slovácko.
On 7 February 2017, he signed for Bulgarian club Cherno More Varna. On 19 February, he made his debut in a 0–2 home defeat against CSKA Sofia, coming on as substitute for Pirulo. On 29 May 2017, his contract was terminated by mutual consent.

On 8 August 2017, Hlúpik signed a short-term contract with Ålandic club Mariehamn.

He was called up to the Czech Republic national under-21 team in 2011, but failed to make an appearance.

References

External links
 
 
 

1991 births
Living people
People from Uherské Hradiště
Czech footballers
Czech Republic youth international footballers
Czech First League players
1. FC Slovácko players
First Professional Football League (Bulgaria) players
PFC Cherno More Varna players
Veikkausliiga players
IFK Mariehamn players
Czech expatriate footballers
Czech expatriate sportspeople in Bulgaria
Czech expatriate sportspeople in Finland
Expatriate footballers in Bulgaria
Expatriate footballers in Finland
Association football midfielders
Association football wingers
FK Fotbal Třinec players
1. FK Příbram players
Czech National Football League players
Sportspeople from the Zlín Region